Franklinothrips vespiformis, the vespiform thrips, is a species of predatory thrip in the family Aeolothripidae. It is found in the Caribbean, Central America, North America, Oceania, South America, Southern Asia, and Europe.

References

Further reading

 
 
 
 

Thrips
Articles created by Qbugbot
Insects described in 1909